O'Hare International Airport is a major airport in Chicago.

O'Hare may also refer to:

 USS O'Hare (DD-889), a US Navy destroyer
 O'Hare (surname), a surname (and list of people with the name)
 Edward O'Hare, a U.S. Naval aviator and the namesake of the airport and the ship
 O'Hare, Chicago, a US community area

See also
 Collingwood O'Hare, animation studio
 O'Hara (disambiguation)
 Ohaře, a village in the Czech Republic